Nainglaj is a village in Belgaum district in the southwestern state of Karnataka, India.

References

Villages in Belagavi district